Cetenov is a municipality and village in Liberec District in the Liberec Region of the Czech Republic. It has about 200 inhabitants.

Administrative parts
Villages and hamlets of Dehtáry, Dolánky, Hrubý Lesnov, Těšnov and Vystrkov are administrative parts of Cetenov.

History
The first written mention of Cetenov is from 1536.

References

Villages in Liberec District